The Sonhat is a large coal field located in the east of India in Chhattisgarh. Sonhat represents one of the largest coal reserve in India having estimated reserves of 2.67 billion tonnes of coal.

Coal filed having coal as below: (in million tonnes)

See also 
 Hasdeo River

References 

Coalfields of India
Mining in Chhattisgarh